The 2013–14 season is Beitar Jerusalem's 45th season in the Israeli Premier League.

Season overview 

In May 2013, Eli Tabib negotiated with owner Arcadi Gaydamak with the target of purchasing Beitar Jerusalem. Gaydamak tried to find other investors in Russia whilst the negotiations with Tabib were ongoing.

On 4 June 2013, Eli Tabib purchased 75% of Beitar and the fan's group, "Amutat Ohadi Beitar", acquired 25% of the club. Elsewhere Gaydamak announced that he had achieved in finding a team of investors that was being represented by businessman, Tamirlan Majidov.

The fans began to claim that Majidov was actually working for Gaydamak and started to protest outside Gaydamak's house and announced that they wouldn't buy tickets or season tickets.

On 18 June 2013 Majidov notified that he had not bought Beitar, and Tabib officially became Beitar Jerusalem's chairman.

Soon after, Tabib signed Eli Cohen as the manager of the team, and extended David Amsalem's contract as the assistant manager.

On 3 December, after 3 consecutive losses in the league, Eli Tabib sacked Eli Cohen and David Amsalem became the caretaker manager.

On 9 December, Ronny Levy was appointed as the team's manager until the end of the season.

First team

Summer transfers

Winter transfers

Ligat Ha'Al (Premier League)

Fixtures

League table

Results summary

Bottom playoff

Table

Results summary

Results by round

League goalscorers per round

State Cup

Fixtures

Goalscorers

1 goal
  Shlomi Azulay
  Pablo Brandán
  Nisso Kapiloto

References

External links
 Beitar Jerusalem website

Beitar Jerusalem F.C. seasons
Beitar Jerusalem
Beitar Jerusalem